Nida Qilla is a village located in the north eastern Pishin District of Balochistan province, Pakistan.

It is also called Hāji Nīda Khan Qilla.

Populated places in Pishin District